The November 2009 Indian Ocean migrant boat disaster occurred in the early hours of Monday, 2 November 2009, when a boat carrying about forty Sri Lankan asylum seekers sank in the Indian Ocean at a distance of some  north-west of the Cocos (Keeling) Islands. According to the initial reports made the same day, more than 20 migrants were missing after 17 had been accounted for and/or saved by the RAAF and the Royal Flying Doctor Service of Australia. The day after on 3 November 2009, one migrant was confirmed dead, his body having been found, and at least eleven were reported as missing.

The boat had issued a distress signal late Sunday night and it was detected in international waters within Australia's search and rescue zone. Two vessels responded to the initial distress call, a commercial ship carrying liquid natural gas, the LNG Pioneer and a trawler named FV Kuamg. It is believed the migrant boat capsized during attempts to rescue the passengers made by the two vessels, who could nevertheless pick up more than a dozen survivors before the arrival of the Australian authorities.

See also
 2010 Christmas Island boat disaster
 SIEV X

Sources

 
 

International maritime incidents
Immigration to Australia
Migrant boat disasters
Maritime incidents in 2009
2009 in Australia
2009 disasters in Australia